Arch Alfred Moore Capito (born August 30, 1982) is an American attorney and politician who has served in the West Virginia House of Delegates from the 35th district since 2016. He announced on November 29, 2022 that he would stand as a candidate for governor of West Virginia in 2024.

Capito earned a Bachelor of Arts from Duke University and a Juris Doctor from the Washington and Lee University School of Law.

He is the son of U.S. Senator Shelley Moore Capito, the grandson of Arch A. Moore Jr. and Shelley Riley Moore, and the cousin of Riley Moore.                                                       
He is also the grandson of Ruth Eskew and Charles Lewis Capito

References

1982 births
Living people
Republican Party members of the West Virginia House of Delegates
Moore family of West Virginia
21st-century American politicians
Candidates in the 2024 United States elections